Tokyo Day Trip is a live EP by Pat Metheny with bassist Christian McBride and drummer Antonio Sanchez released on May 20, 2008. The album was recorded live at Blue Note Tokyo in Tokyo, Japan.

Track listing

Personnel
 Pat Metheny – guitar, electric sitar, baritone and acoustic guitars
 Christian McBride – double bass
 Antonio Sánchez – drums, orchestra bells

Technical staff
Recorded by David Oakes
Assisted by Carolyn Chrzan
Mixed by Pete Karam
Project Coordinator: David Sholemson
Tour Manager: Jerry Wortman

References 

Pat Metheny live albums
2008 live albums
Nonesuch Records EPs
Instrumental albums